Big Bear Solar Observatory (BBSO) is a university-based solar observatory in the United States. It is operated by New Jersey Institute of Technology (NJIT). BBSO has a  clear aperture Goode Solar Telescope (GST), which has no obscuration in the optical train. The telescopes and instruments at the observatory are designed and employed specifically for studying the activities and phenomena of the Sun.

Establishment

The observatory location was chosen for its location on the high-altitude Big Bear Lake in the San Bernardino Mountains. The combination of high altitude and the daytime stabilizing influence of the lake were found to be ideal of solar observation. The location at Big Bear Lake is optimal due to the clarity of the sky and the presence of a body of water. The lake has more than a mile of water to the west, which is the direction from which the prevailing winds come. The cool lake provides a natural inversion that greatly reduces ground-layer turbulence and stabilizes images taken by the telescope (the water provides a cooling effect on the atmosphere surrounding the building and helps eliminate ground heat radiation waves that normally would cause optical aberrations). The main observatory building is in the open waters of the lake with an approximate  causeway extending south from the north shore.

Instruments 

The observatory was originally equipped with  four telescopes, including two  refracting telescopes, a  reflecting coronograph, and a  Cassegrain reflecting telescope.

In 1997, the primary BBSO telescope was in the  class, as were the world's other high resolution solar telescopes. Correction of distortion by the terrestrial atmospheric distortion by adaptive optics is the enabling technology for the first facility class solar telescope built in the United States in a generation – the Goode Solar Telescope (GST). The GST is a  clear aperture off-axis telescope, which feeds its unobstructed light to visible light and near-infrared (NIR) spectro-polarimeters. The GST benefits from three generations of AO, which now includes multi-conjugate AO (MCAO) in a demonstrator phase for wide-field correction. It is the only MCAO system in operation with three deformable mirrors.

Light corrected by adaptive optics is fed to either the visible (VIS) or near-infrared (NIRIS) spectro-polarimeter.  Additionally, uncorrected light can be fed to a cryogenic spectrograph (CYRA) operating out to wavelengths of 5 microns.  BBSO also operates full-disk patrol telescopes.  The telescopes and instruments at the observatory are designed and employed specifically for studying the activities and phenomena of the Sun.

Construction of the GST began in 2005 and the telescope saw first light in January 2009, with first AO corrected imaging in the summer of 2010 in the NIR.  Second generation AO corrected visible light in the summer of 2012.  In summer 2016, first successful MCAO observations were made, which roughly trebled the corrected field of view – MCAO is essential for studies requiring wide field correction with high temporal cadence.

The telescope was named the Goode Solar Telescope in July 2017.

Other telescopes in BBSO include the  Full Disk H-alpha (FDHA) Patrol Telescope, located in an additional small building called the Ash Dome.  It is co-mounted with another small telescope dedicated to observing earthshine. The observatory also hosts a station of the Global Oscillation Network Group, an experiment in helioseismology operated by the National Solar Observatory.  It is located at the shore end of the causeway and began operating in 1995.

Transfer of operations
In 1995, when professor Zirin announced his intent to retire as the director, Caltech began to search for a successor. Eventually, the university decided to change the focus of what had been a solar-physics slot in the astrophysics department and to look for another organization to take over the observatory. By the spring of 1996, Caltech announced that the New Jersey Institute of Technology (NJIT) would run the BBSO. The agreement was signed in early 1997 to have NJIT lease the land and buildings from Caltech until 2048. The instruments and grants, worth about $1.6 million a year at that time, were transferred to NJIT on July 1, 1997.

After the transfer, the directorship of BBSO passed to NJIT professor Philip R. Goode.  Currently NJIT professor Wenda Cao is BBSO director.  Funding comes from NASA, the National Science Foundation, the United States Air Force, and other agencies.

See also 
 Big Bear Discovery Center
 List of astronomical observatories
 List of solar telescopes

References

External links 
 
 Big Bear Solar Observatory Clear Sky Clock Forecast of observing conditions.
 NJIT Physics Dept.
 Big Bear Solar Observatory

Astronomical observatories in California
Solar telescopes
Big Bear Valley
Buildings and structures in San Bernardino County, California
San Bernardino Mountains
Solar observatories